The 1962 Cupa României Final was the 24th final of Romania's most prestigious football cup competition. It was disputed between Steaua București and Rapid București, and was won by Steaua București after a game with 6 goals. It was the 6th cup for Steaua București.

Match details

See also 
List of Cupa României finals

References

External links
Romaniansoccer.ro

1962
Cupa
Romania